Ralph Williams may refer to:

Ralph Champneys Williams (1848–1927), colonial governor
R. C. Williams (1888–1984), Assistant Surgeon General of the U.S. Public Health Service
Ralph Vaughan Williams (1872–1958), English composer
Ralph Williams (American football) (born 1958)
Ralph Williams (athlete) (1900-1941), American long-distance runner
Ralph Williams (cricketer) (1879–1958), English cricketer and barrister
Ralph Williams (rodeo), cowboy in 2012 National Finals Rodeo
Ralph E. Williams (1917–2009), United States Navy officer and speechwriter for Dwight D. Eisenhower
Ralph Williams (actor), a Broadway and film actor who appeared in All the President's Men
Ralph Williams, an actor who appeared in the American 2011 comedy film Answer This!
Ralph Williams (footballer) (1905–1985), Welsh professional football centre forward
Ralph Williams (author) (1914–1959), American science fiction author
Ralph Williams (politician), Mississippi politician